Yuliy Burkin (b. 1960, Tomsk) is a Russian science fiction writer and musician. He has coauthored a trilogy Island Russia with Sergey Lukyanenko.

Books

External links 
 Official site

1960 births
Living people
People from Tomsk
Russian musicians
Russian science fiction writers
Tomsk State University alumni